Celebrations of the 100th anniversary of the founding of the Chinese Communist Party, or the Centennial of the Chinese Communist Party, were held on 1 July 2021 in Beijing to celebrate the centennial of the founding of the Chinese Communist Party (CCP), which has been the sole governing political party of the People's Republic of China (PRC) since 1949. CCP General Secretary Xi Jinping, as the guest of honor, delivered a speech and presented the Order of July the First order of honour to CCP members who have made significant contributions. Premier Li Keqiang served as the official host of the event.

Similar celebrations were scheduled nationwide in mainland China, the Macau Special Administrative Region, and the Hong Kong Special Administrative Region, coinciding with the 24th anniversary of the handover from the United Kingdom on the same day.

Background

The CCP was founded in 1921 by Chen Duxiu and Li Dazhao, with the help of the Far Eastern Bureau of the Russian Social Democratic Labour Party (Bolsheviks), who seized power in Russia after the 1917 October Revolution, and the Far Eastern Secretariat of the Communist International. From 1927 to 1950, the CCP fought a civil war against the Kuomintang-led government but it temporarily ceased its hostilities to form a short-lived alliance with the Kuomintang to fight the war against Japan, and in 1949, it emerged victorious when Chairman Mao proclaimed the establishment of the People's Republic of China, and the Republic of China retreated to Taiwan. Since then, the CCP has been the sole ruling party in the country, renamed the People's Republic of China in 1949.

Preparations 
Leading up to the centenary celebrations, the Chinese government has been promoting Xi Jinping's outlook on history as the new orthodoxy. Internet censorship was stepped up while museums across the country curated exhibitions related to history of the CCP. The Guardian reported that the CCP has been assiduously pushing the official narrative and its official history across the entire country since the beginning of 2021. Adulatory messages such as "Listen to the party, appreciate the party, follow the party" adorned banners and billboards, foreign journalists were given tours to spread the official narrative, and Buddhist temples held special anniversary events. The National Film Administration mandated local film authorities, film and cinema companies and production firms to screen and promote, starting 1 April, "outstanding films" – works "closely focused on the themes of loving the party, loving the nation and loving socialism," and "sing the praises of … and eulogise the Party, the motherland, its people and its heroes". China Central Television (CCTV) produced a patriotic television series, called The Awakening Age, glorifying Chinese revolutionary history from 1915 to 1921; a collection of 100 rappers produced a 15-minute track praising the Party called "100%".

In preparation for the Centennial, efforts at suppressing and tailoring the Party's history were stepped up. The Party uses manufactured historical memories to legitimize the Party's place in society. The highlighting of the Party's centenary followed the CCP's general pattern of periodizing history. It is contrasted with the century of humiliation trope.

The first full rehearsal for the festivities took place on 13 June 2021. Security was strengthened leading up to the celebrations, with an increase in the number of officers of the People's Armed Police and officers of the state security police in Beijing. The first press conference hosted by the Press Center took place on 27 June 2021.

Hong Kong 

Although the Civil Human Rights Front, traditional organisers of the annual march, announced that it was cancelling its plans, three other pro-democracy groups stepped in with an application to hold a demonstration, but the request was refused by police on the grounds of COVID-19 restrictions. Thousands of police were mobilised to prevent any possible protests, one day after the first anniversary of the implementation of the national security law in the territory. Victoria Park, the traditional starting point of the annual march, was declared off limits due to public order concerns, and all occupants were banished.

Light shows and television extravaganza 

Throughout June 2021, light shows took place in celebration of the anniversary in multiple Chinese cities including Beijing, Shanghai and Shenzhen.

An extravaganza produced by China Central Television was held at the Beijing National Stadium on 28 June 2021. It starred over 90 celebrities. The gala evening concluded with a huge fireworks display and a rendition of "Without the Communist Party, There Would be No New China".

Tiananmen Square ceremony 
A national ceremony and rally of 70,000 took place on Tiananmen Square in Beijing. It was attended by CCP General Secretary Xi Jinping, former General Secretary Hu Jintao, Chinese Premier Li Keqiang, former Premier Wen Jiabao and members of the Politburo of the Chinese Communist Party. Hong Kong and Macau Chief Executives Carrie Lam and Ho Iat-seng were also in attendance. However, former CCP General Secretary Jiang Zemin and former Chinese Premier Zhu Rongji were absent.

The events began with a flag raising ceremony by the PLA Honour Guard after it marched off from the sides of the Monument to the People's Heroes, with a gun salute of 56 gunners (representing the 56 officially recognized ethnic groups of China) being fired 100 times (representing the 100 years of the party) in the background. The Flag of China was raised to the national anthem of the People's Republic of China, March of the Volunteers. The Communist Youth League of China and the Young Pioneers of China also read a message of congratulations.

Military flypast
In March 2021, General Li Jun, assistant to the director of the Political Work Department of the Central Military Commission, had said at a news conference that the expected military parade would not occur. The traditional military parade was replaced by a flypast of Chinese aircraft. Seventy-one People's Liberation Army Air Force fighters flew over Tiananmen Square, with helicopters and fighter jets forming the numbers "100" and "71".

Speech by Xi Jinping 
Later, General Secretary Xi Jinping delivered an hour-long speech in which he specifically declared the realization of the first of the Two Centenaries' goals. 

In his speech, Xi coined the phrase "whole-process people's democracy" and tied the concept to "common prosperity."

While Xi warned during his speech that "any foreign force who attempted to bully China would find their heads broken and bashed bloody against the great wall of steel forged by the blood and flesh of 1.4 billion Chinese people", the official translation used the analogy "on a collision course with a great wall of steel". Xi praised the Communist Party, saying that there would be no new China without it, and it had "profoundly transformed the advancement of the Chinese nation ... [being] ... the foundation and lifeblood of the party and the country, and the crux upon which the interests and wellbeing of all Chinese people depend."

With respect to Taiwan, he stressed the need to "crush any Taiwan independence", reiterating the adherence to the one China principle and the 1992 Consensus, and the goal of completing unification, although the People's Republic of China has never ruled over the island. The spokesperson of Taiwan's Presidential Office, Kolas Yotaka, retorted that the CCP ought to "grow up" and "just pick another birthday gift for itself", while the Taiwanese Mainland Affairs Council called for a democratic transition in China on the CCP's 100th anniversary.

Incidents

Hong Kong suicide attack  

Amidst heavy police presence in Causeway Bay aimed at stopping demonstrations along the traditional march route in Hong Kong, a 50-year-old man stabbed a police officer in the back with a knife at 10 pm, and then turned the knife on himself. The police officer was rushed to hospital in a critical condition but survived, while the alleged assailant was declared dead upon arrival at the hospital. Hong Kong's newly appointed Security Secretary, Chris Tang, declared it a "terrorist act" committed by a "lone wolf", but blamed "many people who have encouraged violence and incited hatred toward society and the country". After mourners started laying flowers at the location where the suspect fell, police warned against mourning, amounting it to "supporting terrorism".

Twitter incident 
Anne-Marie Brady, a Sinologist at Canterbury University in New Zealand and prominent critic of the CCP, saw her Twitter account temporarily suspended as a result of her tweets mocking Xi Jinping and the lack of international validation of the centenary. A columnist for The Times said that the block was probably an algorithmic response to the number of complaints from CCP agents that would have been received by Twitter. Her account was subsequently restored.

Symbols

Commemorative coins
On 21 June 2021, the People's Bank of China issued a set of nine commemorative coins for the anniversary.

Medal
  
Since June 2021, the "Glorious 50 Years in the Party" Commemorative Medal has been awarded, and the award will continue until 1 July. It consists of the party emblem, a five-pointed star, the flag, a monument, a sunflower, and other elements. The CCP award ceremony to present the 1 July Medal to outstanding CCP members took place on 29 June 2021.

Gallery

See also 
 70th anniversary of the People's Republic of China
 100th Anniversary of the Xinhai Revolution and Republic of China
 Two Centenaries
 Xi Jinping Administration

References 

2020s in Beijing
2021 in China
Anniversaries
Regional centennial anniversaries
Events in Beijing
July 2021 events in China
History of the Chinese Communist Party